Halectinosoma is a genus of copepods belonging to the family Ectinosomatidae.

The genus has almost cosmopolitan distribution.

Species:
 Halectinosoma abyssicola Bodin, 1968
 Halectinosoma angulifrons (Sars, 1919)

References

Harpacticoida
Copepod genera